John Thomas Hailer (born 1960) is an American financial services executive, who retired in April 2017 as president and chief executive officer of Natixis Global Asset Management – The Americas & Asia, a subsidiary of French bank Natixis.

Career 
Hailer began his career at Fidelity in 1986, selling corporate cash products, retirement plans and pension fund management services.  From there he joined Putnam Investments where he served as senior vice president and director of retail business development.

In 1994 Hailer returned to Fidelity.  He served as senior vice president of international business development for the Americas and senior vice president of strategic marketing with the Fidelity Investments Institutional Services Company, with responsibility for new business development in North America and Latin America and directing product and marketing development for institutional channels. He also helped the firm launch its first-ever series of closed-end mutual funds.

He joined what was then known as IXIS Asset Management Advisors Group in 1999, and was named chief executive officer.  He was appointed chief executive officer of Natixis Global Associates in 2006 following the merger of the asset management and investment banking operations of Natexis Banques Populaires (Banque Populaire group) and IXIS (Groupe Caisse d'Epargne). In 2007 Hailer was named president and chief executive officer of Natixis Global Asset Management – The Americas & Asia.  He is responsible for NGAM's distribution strategies worldwide and oversees the business activities of the firm's asset management affiliates in the United States and Asia.

Hailer has been highly visible in the media and at conferences, speaking on issues such as the economy, regulatory reform, corporate taxation, investments, future trends in retirement and other issues on outlets such as CNBC, Fox Business News, Bloomberg TV and NECN.

Hailer has also been a key spokesperson for Natixis’ Durable Portfolio Construction Research Centre, which publishes four reports a year as a result of research and surveys on retirement  and investor sentiment

He is also a prominent voice at the state and federal level on economic issues, including job creation and growth, globalization, infrastructure spending, regional economic cooperation and regional economic development.

Under Hailer's leadership, Natixis has expanded its corporate philanthropy program,  establishing relationships with a variety of social service non-profits, including, Pine Street Inn,  Strong Women Strong Girls, Elizabeth Stone House,  Community Work Services,  Ellis Memorial and Eldredge House, St. Francis House, United Way of Massachusetts Bay and Merrimack Valley,  Best Buddies International, Boston Medical Centre and the Home for Little Wanderers.  Natixis was also the 2014 Presenting Sponsor of the Newport Jazz Festival and the 2014 Berklee College Summer Music Series.

Hailer is also responsible for creating an Adopt-A-School Program in partnership with the City of Boston and the John Winthrop Elementary School in Dorchester. The program has provided the school with major technology advances, school supply drives, winter holiday gift drives, and a mentoring program that partners children with Natixis employees and funding for other school programs.

Together these organizations, many of which have been an integral part of the city for more than a hundred years, improve the lives of hundreds of thousands of individuals each year and play a critical role in battling a number of social issues, including homelessness. Hailer has been an advocate for eradicating homelessness in the Boston area, speaking to the Boston Globe in 2014 regarding the importance of supporting organizations that work with the homeless.

All of Hailer's qualities have caught the eye of other prominent CEOs, including Larry Lucchino of the Boston Red Sox, who told the Boston Business Journal that he admired Hailer's cutting-edge vision and relentlessness.

Awards and recognition 

Hailer and Natixis employees have been recognized numerous times for their corporate philanthropy work and volunteerism. 
In 2012, Hailer was named a recipient of the Massachusetts Women's Political Caucus Good Guys Award for his work on behalf of victims of domestic violence and his efforts to promote hiring of women in the financial services industry. In 2010, Hailer was honoured by St. Francis House with its All the Way Home Award. and serves as co-chairman of the Boston Financial Services Leadership Council. 

In 2013, the Irish International Immigrant Centre presented its Solas Award to Hailer in recognition of his leadership in promoting philanthropy and volunteerism, and for his advocacy for Comprehensive Immigration Reform. In 2014, Hailer was named the most admired CEO by the Boston Business Journal. Hailer was recognized along with Boston Red Sox President and CEO Larry Lucchino Fidelity Investments President Abigail Johnson.

Hailer is admired for creating jobs in Boston, something he said has been his proudest business accomplishment while working for his organization for the past 15 years. Under Hailer, NGAM has added over 500 people in Boston over the past decade and currently employs 1,400 in Boston. Hailer has transformed the firm into a worldwide leader in investment strategy and financial solutions with over $890 billion in assets under management as of December 31, 2014.

Under Hailer, Natixis was recognized as having the most generous employees for the past three years by the Boston Business Journal, and in 2014 Natixis was named among the top charitable corporations by the Boston Business Journal, placing 33rd out of 73 firms. The Boston Globe also named Natixis among the best places to work in Boston in 2014 for the seventh consecutive year.

Personal background 
Hailer received a Bachelor of Arts degree in history and government in 1983 from Beloit College,   which he served as a member of the board of trustees.  Hailer is a member of a number of civic and philanthropic organizations, serving as a chairman of the New England Council, a regional business and community interest organization.

Hailer serves on the board of trustees at Berklee College of Music.

He also is a member of the board of directors of Boston Medical Centre and serves as co-chairman of the Boston Financial Services Leadership Council. He is a former chair of the board of directors of The Home for Little Wanderers, the oldest continuously operated children's charity in the United States.

References

External links 
 Natixis Global Asset Management

American business executives
1960 births
Living people
Beloit College alumni